143 Records was the record label of producer David Foster. 143 was a sub-label of Warner Records and Atlantic Records. The numbers 1-4-3 are derived from the words "I (1 letter) love (4 letters) you (3 letters)."

History
When record producer David Foster signed a deal with Warner Bros. in 1995, it enabled him to start 143 Records. Foster gave the responsibility for running the label to manager Brian Avnet. One of the label's first signing was Irish folk-rock band The Corrs.

In 1997 Foster and Avnet concluded "logo labels" like 143 were in a "bad spot". Foster sold the label back to Warner and then became senior vice-president at the corporation. On September 20, 2001, Warner Music Group announced it was shutting down the label.

Roster
 Bars and Melody
 Michael Bublé
 Peter Cincotti
 The Corrs
 Jackie Evancho
 Josh Groban
 Beth Hart
 Jordan Hill (through Atlantic)
 William Joseph
 Lace
 Renee Olstead
 Plus One
 Jake Zyrus
 theSTART

References

External links
 Official site

Vanity record labels
Warner Music labels
American country music record labels